Liberté was a French-language newspaper in Algeria. Its head office was in El Achour, Algiers. The paper was privately owned and had an independent political stance. Its owner was an Algerian businessman Issad Rebrab. In August 2003 Liberté temporarily ceased publication due to its debt to state-run printing presses, but returned to availability shortly afterwards. The paper folded in April 2022.

References

External links
 Liberté 

1992 establishments in Algeria
2022 disestablishments in Algeria
Defunct newspapers published in Algeria
French-language newspapers published in Algeria
Mass media in Algiers
Publications established in 1992
Publications disestablished in 2022